Beridops is a genus of flies in the family Stratiomyidae.

Species
Beridops abdominalis James, 1973
Beridops maculipennis (Blanchard, 1854)
Beridops nigripes James, 1973
Beridops penai James, 1973

References

Stratiomyidae
Brachycera genera
Taxa named by Günther Enderlein
Diptera of South America